The Furness Railway Trust is a heritage railway preservation organisation many of whose properties were originally owned by the Furness Railway. It is now based at the Ribble Steam Railway at Preston, Lancashire, England following its relocation from the Lakeside and Haverthwaite Railway. New accommodation which is shared with the Ribble Steam Railway has been built and is used to house, restore and maintain the Trust's locomotives and other vehicles. The Trust often hires its locomotives and stock to other privately owned railways in the UK where they can be seen working.

The Trust owns:  
 Furness Railway Nº20, Britain's oldest working standard gauge steam locomotive. At Ribble Steam Railway, currently undergoing its second 10 year overhaul. 
 Furness Railway Nº25, ownership passed to FRT in 2015 after death of Bert Hitchen, it will be restored to operating order as an 0-4-0ST, the way it was rebuilt for Barrow Steelworks when sold by FR, now at the Trust's base at the Ribble Steam Railway following its transfer from Steamtown Carnforth. 
 GWR 5600 Class 0-6-2T No. 5643 (currently at the Embsay Steam Railway)
 GWR Hall Class 4-6-0 No. 4979 Wootton Hall  
 War Department No. WD 194 Hunslet Austerity 0-6-0ST  now named Cumbria (currently at the Embsay Steam Railway)
 Fowler 0-4-0DM Fluff No. 21999

The Trust also owns a number of other passenger and goods vehicles, including:

 A North London Railway 2nd Class carriage (currently on loan to the Beamish Open Air Museum) 
  A set of vintage carriages which when restored will be formed into a vintage passenger train. 
 The only surviving Furness Railway goods wagon - bogie bolster No. 5999 
 LMS goods brake van no. M731874 (currently at the Rutland Railway Museum in the East Midlands)

References

External links 
 
 ribblesteam.co.uk

Trust
Railway museums in England
Museums in Preston